Suņi Iziet Ielās is the debut studio album by Latvian pop band Citi Zēni. It was released on October 28, 2021, through TCLV Records.

Background 
Suņi Iziet Ielās is Citi Zēni's first studio release, followed by the release of three singles. While the album was supposed to be released in the summer of 2021, it was delayed to the fall. In an interview, lead singer Jānis Pētersons wrote that "We have decided to postpone the release of the album until the world gets back on track. There is nowhere to hurry, because it is best to enjoy music in peace." The album was eventually released on October 28, 2021.

Music and lyrics 
Citi Zēni has stated in interviews that the album was meant to bring joy in dark times, and to bring a sense of irony on current events. The band's drummer, Toms Kagainis, said that "We have to stop waiting for someone else to create something positive, instead we want to give everyone a chance to get lost in our music and forget about everything else."

Reception 
The album was considered a commercial success in Citi Zēni's home country of Latvia. A review from Latvian newspaper Neatkarīgā Rīta Avīze praised the album's takes on current events and the jokes on Latvian society. However, it also criticized the album for falling into the mainstream pop music industry, with no uniqueness to set it apart.

Track listings

References 

2021 debut albums